Białogóra  is a village in the administrative district of Gmina Krokowa, within Puck County, Pomeranian Voivodeship, in northern Poland. It is located on the Slovincian Coast in the historic region of Pomerania.

The village has a population of 359.

References

Villages in Puck County
Populated coastal places in Poland
Seaside resorts in Poland